Conway Park railway station is situated in the centre of Birkenhead, Merseyside, England. It lies on the Wirral Line of the Merseyrail network.

History 
Conway Park is the newest station on the Wirral Line. In 1990, the Merseyside Development Corporation joined with British Rail and Merseyrail to study the cost of the new station. The station opened to the public on 22 June 1998, after an official opening by Neil Kinnock on 24 April 1998. Conway Park is between Birkenhead Park and Hamilton Square stations, approached on either side by a tunnel built by the Mersey Railway in the 1880s. The platforms are reached by stairs or lifts from the ticket office.

The station was built in order to provide a station on the lines from New Brighton and West Kirby that was more convenient for the town centre of Birkenhead than either Birkenhead Park or Hamilton Square (which are otherwise the nearest stations). Its name comes from the name of the redevelopment area on the north side of the town centre in which it is situated. The name has come under criticism as some regard it not to be particularly indicative of the station's location. When it was originally being planned, the station was known as Birkenhead Market. The platforms are protected by ticket barriers. The road which the station is situated on is Europa Boulevard.

Facilities
The station is staffed during all opening hours and has platform CCTV. There are toilets, a payphone, a vending machine, booking office and live departure and arrival screens, for passenger information. The station does not have a free car park, though there is a drop-off point on Europa Boulevard, as well as a "Pay and Display" car park, to the rear of the station as viewed from Birkenhead town centre. Step-free access to the platforms, for wheelchairs and prams, is possible, via the lifts. Each platform also has sheltered seating. Free Wi-Fi was introduced in October 2015. There is secure cycle parking for 10 cycles.

Services 

During the daytime peak (7:00 - 19:00), there are four trains per hour to New Brighton and West Kirby and eight trains per hour to Liverpool.  Outside of the daytime peak, the frequency is halved. 
These services are provided by Merseyrail's fleet of Class 507 and Class 508 EMUs. These trains will soon be replaced by Merseyrail's new fleet, coming in 2019–21.

See also

 List of underground stations of the Merseyrail network

References

Sources

Further reading

External links 

 Description of the construction of Conway Park railway station

Buildings and structures in Birkenhead
DfT Category E stations
Merseyrail underground stations
Railway stations in the Metropolitan Borough of Wirral
Railway stations opened by Railtrack
Railway stations in Great Britain opened in 1998
Railway stations served by Merseyrail